Brynäs IF Dam are an ice hockey team in the Swedish Women's Hockey League (SDHL). They play in Gävle, on the eastern-central coast of Sweden, at the Monitor ERP Arena. A constituent part of the Swedish sports club Brynäs IF, they are the sister team of Brynäs IF of the Swedish Hockey League (SHL).

History 
Between 2010 and 2013, the club advanced to the Riksserien playoff finals four seasons in a row, finishing in second place each time. In 2014, the club unveiled new jerseys, the only ones in Europe to be completely ad-free.

Between 2013 and 2019, the club saw its fortunes decline dramatically, and in 2017, head coach Madeleine Östling left the club to coach Linköping instead.

After the 2017–18 season saw Brynäs finish in 8th place amid numerous complaints surrounding the treatment of players, the club launched a significant rebuild, firing head coach Åke Lilljebjörn, increasing investment into development programmes, and signing star forward Erika Grahm on a player-coach contract with the intention of training her to be the organisation's future Sports Manager.

After making a number of major signings, including Lara Stalder, Michela Cava, and Kateřina Mrázová, improved to 3rd in the league during the 2019–20 SDHL season, and advanced to the semi-finals for the first time in seven years. In January 2020, the club announced a cooperation with the municipality to create a local sports education centre, allowing young girls to specialise in hockey education during high school. After the end of the season, Stalder would be the first women to be awarded the Guldhjälmen as the SDHL's most valuable player.

The team began the 2020–21 SDHL season with a seven-game winning streak, the last team in the league to remain undefeated until a 5–3 loss to Linköping HC.

Season-by-season results 
This is a partial list of the most recent seasons completed by Brynäs IF Dam. Note that the SDHL was known as Riksserien until 2016.

Code explanation: Finish = Rank at end of regular season; GP = Games played, W = Wins (3 points), OTW = Overtime wins (2 points), OTL = Overtime losses (1 point), L = Losses, GF = Goals for, GA = Goals against, Pts = Points, Top scorer: Points (Goals+Assists)

Players and personnel

2022–23 roster 

Coaching staff and team personnel
 Head coach: Filip Eriksson
 Assistant coach: Andreas Östlund
 Goaltending coach: Johan Ryman
 Conditioning coach: Johan Holmström
 Conditioning coach: Oliver Lindholm
 Development coach: Ove Molin
 Equipment managers: Pernilla Köie & Per Lindholm
 Physical therapists: Kent Larsson & Pär Thures

Team captaincy history 
 Karin Johansson, 2009–10
 Joa Elfsberg, 2010–11
 Karin Johansson, 2012–13
 Angelica Östlund, 2013–2018
 Erika Grahm, 2018–2021
 Rosa Lindstedt, 2021–

Head coaches 
 Johnny Pedersen, 2002–03
 Lars Landström, 2007–2009
 Magnus Grönlund, 2009–2012
 Henrik Orevik, 2012–2015
 Madeleine Östling, 2015–2017
 Åke Lilljebjörn, 2017–18
 Magnus Carlsson, 2018–19
 Henrik Glaas, 2019–2022
 Filip Eriksson, 2022–

Franchise records and leaders

All-time scoring leaders 
The top-ten point-scorers (goals + assists) of Brynäs IF.

Note: Nat = Nationality; Pos = Position; GP = Games played; G = Goals; A = Assists; Pts = Points; P/G = Points per game;  = 2021–22 Brynäs IF player

Source: Elite Prospects

References

External links 
  
 Team information and statistics from Eliteprospects.com and Eurohockey.com

Swedish Women's Hockey League teams
Ice hockey teams in Sweden
Women's ice hockey teams in Europe
Women's ice hockey in Sweden
Ice hockey teams in Gävleborg County